Benjamin Boyd (April 8, 1858 – death date unknown) was an American baseball second baseman and outfielder in the late 19th century, who played in predecessor teams to the Negro leagues. He played from 1885 to 1891, spending the majority of his career with the Cuban Giants. He also played in the minor leagues from 1889 to 1891.

References

External links
  and Seamheads
Cuban Giants

1858 births
Year of death missing
Cuban Giants players
Ansonia Cuban Giants players
Baseball infielders